Shafting may refer to:

 Roof_and_tunnel_hacking#Shafting

See also

 Shaft (disambiguation)